I denna natt blir världen ny – Jul i Betlehem II is an album by Swedish singer Carola Häggkvist. It was released in November 2007 in Sweden, Norway, Denmark and Finland. The album was recorded in Betlehem in mid-2007. The album includes both old Christmas carols and new-written melodies.

Track listing
Stilla natt, heliga natt (Stille Nacht, heilige Nacht)
Lyss till änglasångens ord
Gläns över sjö och strand
I denna natt blir världen ny
Her kommer dine arme små
När det lider mot jul (Det strålar en stjärna)
Vid Betlehem en vinternatt (The First Noel)
Ett barn är fött på denna dag
Mariavisa
Jul, jul, strålande jul
Marias vaggsång
This Child
Go Tell It on the Mountain
Nu tändas tusen juleljus

Singles
 I denna natt blir världen ny

Charts

Release history

References

2007 Christmas albums
Carola Häggkvist albums
Christmas albums by Swedish artists
Gospel Christmas albums
Universal Music Group Christmas albums